The Atlantic Union Bank Pavilion (formerly the nTelos Pavilion and Union Bank & Trust Pavilion) is an outdoor amphitheater in Portsmouth, Virginia, United States.

The venue produces and presents a broad spectrum of concerts and events connects audiences to the inspirational power of music and helps new generations of listeners discover the wonder of music and live performance.  The venue invites audiences and artists to celebrate the joy of live music, the power of community, and the magic of the Pavilion.  The covered outdoor Pavilion is located on the banks of the Elizabeth River in downtown Portsmouth, Virginia and provides one of the best live entertainment experiences in the Hampton Roads area.

It has a capacity of 6,500 people and is located directly across the Elizabeth River from downtown Norfolk.

See also
 List of contemporary amphitheatres

References

External links

Music venues in Virginia
2001 establishments in Virginia